GDNF family receptor alpha-2 (GFRα2), also known as the neurturin receptor, is a protein that in humans is encoded by the GFRA2 gene.

Function 

The GFRA2 protein is a glycosylphosphatidylinositol(GPI)-linked cell surface receptor. It is part of the GDNF receptor family. Glial cell line-derived neurotrophic factor (GDNF) and neurturin (NTN) are two structurally related, potent neurotrophic factors that play key roles in the control of neuron survival and differentiation. They both bind the GFRA2 receptor. The receptor mediates activation of the RET tyrosine kinase receptor. This encoded protein acts preferentially as a receptor for NTN compared to its other family member, GDNF family receptor alpha 1. This gene is a candidate gene for RET-associated diseases.

Interactions 

GFRA2 (gene) has been shown to interact with GDNF.

See also 
 GFRα

References

Further reading